Conasprella kohni is a species of sea snail, a marine gastropod mollusk in the family Conidae, known as the cone snails, cone shells or cones.

Like all species within the genus Conasprella, these cone snails are predatory and venomous. They are capable of "stinging" humans, therefore live ones should be handled carefully or not at all.

Description
The shell grows to a length of 35 mm.

Distribution 
This marine species is endemic to the Galapagos Islands, Ecuador.

References 

 Filmer R.M. (2001). A Catalogue of Nomenclature and Taxonomy in the Living Conidae 1758 - 1998. Backhuys Publishers, Leiden. 388pp
 Tucker J.K. (2009). Recent cone species database. September 4, 2009 Edition
 Puillandre N., Duda T.F., Meyer C., Olivera B.M. & Bouchet P. (2015). One, four or 100 genera? A new classification of the cone snails. Journal of Molluscan Studies. 81: 1-23

External links
 Gastrpods.com: Kohniconus kohni

kohni
Endemic gastropods of the Galápagos Islands
Gastropods described in 1979
Taxonomy articles created by Polbot
Taxobox binomials not recognized by IUCN